Kamieńsk is a town in Poland, in the Łódź Voivodeship, in Radomsko County. As of 2020, it had 2,703 inhabitants.

There is an airport named Kamieńsk-Orla Góra in Kamieńsk mainly used for agricultural purposes.

History
The settlement was first mentioned in a document dated 1291. It received its town charter in 1374. The settlement lost its status as a town in 1870 but regained it in 1994. Over its history the town has been known as Canisko, Camiesko, Kamińsko, Kamiensko and Kamińsk. The spelling Kamieńsk has been used since 1918.

Jewish community

Before the Second World War and the Holocaust the town was a shtetl.

Jews began to settle in Kamieńsk in the 18th century. The earliest Jewish tombstone in the Kamieńsk cemetery dates from 1831. In the 1870s the town selected Israel Stieglitz as its rabbinic leader. He served as its chief rabbi for over 40 years and died in 1921. His son, Pinchas Stieglitz, was selected as his successor and served in that capacity for a short time. There were three synagogues in the city. In 1900, there were 1,064 Christians and 787 Jews in Kamieńsk. By 1917 the Jewish population had grown to 1,163. The principle occupations of the Jewish people were tailoring, shoe-making and small trade. Pinchas Stieglitz and most of his family were murdered in the Holocaust during the German occupation.

Notable people
Jacek Krzynówek (born 1976), Polish former footballer, capped 96 times for the Poland national football team

References

External links

JewishGen ShtetLinks

Cities and towns in Łódź Voivodeship
Radomsko County
Piotrków Governorate
Shtetls
Holocaust locations in Poland